Football Inquest is the name of two Australian television series, which both aired in Melbourne. The first aired 1957 on GTV-9, while the second aired 1960-1974(?) on HSV-7. There was also a South Australian version.

1957
The 1957 version was an early Australian television series which ran from 20 April 1957 to 21 September 1957 on Melbourne television station GTV-9. It was a half-hour weekly series broadcast on Saturdays at 7:30PM.

Hosted by Ian Johnson, Phil Gibbs and Jack Mueller, the series featured also featured V.F.L. players. Sam Loxton was later a regular. The program was simulcast over GTV-9 and 3KZ. Little else is known about the television program, but the radio version certainly predated the simulcast.

1960-1974
Hosted by Michael Williamson, the second version was a panel discussion series which debuted 9 April 1960. It ran for several seasons, the last aired in 1974(?) . During its first season, the series was broadcast on Saturdays at 7:00PM, competing in the time-slot against Pick a Box on GTV-9 and the evening news on ABV-2

South Australia
A South Australian version ran on Channel 9 in Adelaide in the 1960s  and 1970s. Panellists included Max Hall, Ken Cunningham, Lindsay Head, Stan Wickham and Bo Morton.

See also

List of Australian television series

References

External links

Seven Network original programming
Nine Network original programming
1957 Australian television series debuts
1957 Australian television series endings
1960 Australian television series debuts
1974 Australian television series endings
Australian sports television series
English-language television shows
Black-and-white Australian television shows